Kevin Joseph Craig (born July 28, 1968 in Pittsburgh, Pennsylvania) is an American politician and a Democratic member of the West Virginia House of Delegates representing District 13 since January 12, 2013. Craig served consecutively from January 2001 until January 2013 in the District 15 seat.

Education
Craig earned his BBA from the University of Notre Dame and his MBA from Georgia Southern University.

Elections
2012 With all three incumbent District 15 representatives redistricted to District 16, Craig placed first in the May 8, 2012 Democratic Primary with 2,978 votes (37.2%), and placed first in the five-way three-position November 6, 2012 General election with 8,866 votes (22.9%) ahead of incumbent Republican Carol Miller and Jim Morgan and non-selectees Sean Hornbuckle (D) and Mike Davis (R).
2000 To challenge District 15 incumbent Republican Representative Chuck Romine, Craig placed in the five-way 2000 Democratic Primary and was elected in the six-way three-position November 7, 2000 General election alongside Democratic incumbents Arley Johnson and Margarette Leach.
2002 Craig and incumbent Representatives Leach and Morgan were unopposed for the 2002 Democratic Primary and were re-elected in the five-way three-position November 5, 2002 General election.
2004 Craig and incumbent Representatives Leach and Morgan were unopposed for the 2004 Democratic Primary, and were re-elected in the six-way three-position November 2, 2004 General election.
2006 Craig and incumbent Representatives Leach and Morgan were challenged in the five-way 2006 Democratic Primary but all placed; Morgan and Craig were re-elected in the six-way three-position November 7, 2006 General election alongside Republican nominee Carol Miller, unseating Representative Leach.
2008 Craig placed second in the three-way May 13, 2008 Democratic Primary with 5,179 votes (36.9%), and placed first in the six-way three-position November 4, 2008 General election with 10,522 votes (23.4%) and ahead of incumbents Morgan (D) and Miller (R), and non-selectees Carl Eastham (D), James Carden (R), and Paula Stewart (R).
2010 Craig and Representative Morgan were challenged in the five-way May 11, 2010 Democratic Primary where Craig placed first with 2,800 votes (29.7%), and placed first in the six-way three-position November 2, 2010 General election with 6,886 votes (20.6%) ahead of  Representatives Miller (R) and Morgan (D) and non-selectees Matthew Woelfel (D), Patrick Lucas (R), and Douglas Franklin (R).

References

External links
Official page at the West Virginia Legislature

Kevin Craig at Ballotpedia
Kevin J. Craig at the National Institute on Money in State Politics

1968 births
Living people
Georgia Southern University alumni
Democratic Party members of the West Virginia House of Delegates
Politicians from Huntington, West Virginia
Politicians from Pittsburgh
United States Army officers
Mendoza College of Business alumni